Thout 6 - Coptic Calendar - Thout 8

The seventh day of the Coptic month of Thout, the first month of the Coptic year. On a common year, this day corresponds to September 4, of the Julian Calendar, and September 17, of the Gregorian Calendar.  This day falls in the Coptic season of Akhet, the season of inundation.

Commemorations

Feasts 

 Coptic New Year Period

Saints 
 The martyrdom of Saint Rebecca and her five children, Agathon, Peter, John, Amun and Amuna
 The departure of Pope Dioscorus, the twenty-fifth Patriarch of the See of Saint Mark
 The departure of Pope John XII, the ninety-third Patriarch of the See of Saint Mark
 The departure of Saint Severian, Bishop of Gabala

References 

Days of the Coptic calendar